Ayatollah Sheikh Muhammad-Jawad al-Balaghi al-Najafi (1865 – December 10, 1933) was an Iraqi Shia religious authority, author, poet, and polemicist. It is reported that besides his native Arabic language, al-Balaghi was also well-versed in English, Hebrew and Persian.

He was a prominent student of Mirza Muhammad-Taqi al-Shirazi, supporting him throughout the Iraqi revolt of 1920; and Muhammad-Kadhim al-Khurasani.

Family 
al-Balaghi was from the prominent religious al-Balaghi family. Their origins go back to the Rubeya clan of the tribal Arab Adnanite confederation. al-Balaghi's great ancestor, Sheikh Muhammad al-Balaghi immigrated to Karbala in 1457 to seek a religious education. The patriarch of the intellectual family was Sheikh Muhammad-Ali al-Balaghi who died in Karbala in 1592, who was a grand religious authority, and one of the disseminators of Usul al-Kafi. Later, Sheikh Muhammad-Ali's grandson, Sheikh Hassan al-Balaghi travelled to Najaf, and settled in 1693. al-Balaghi's lineage is as follows:Muḥammad-Jawād bin Ḥassan bin Ṭalib bin ʿAbbās bin Ibrahīm bin Ḥusayn bin ʿAbbās II bin Ḥassan bin ʿAbbās I bin Muḥammad-ʿAli bin Ḥassan bin Muḥammad bin Balāgh bin Walī-Allāh bin Darwīsh [leading to] Asad bin Rabīʿa bin Nizar bin Maʿad bin ʿAdnan.

Early life and education 
al-Balaghi was born to Sheikh Hassan al-Balaghi (d. 1882) in November 1865. He grew up in Najaf, and moved to Kadhimiya in 1888 to pursue a religious education.

Education 
Upon completing his muqadamat (introductory studies), he returned to Najaf in 1894. Whilst in Najaf he studied under scholars like Sheikh Muhammad-Kadhim al-Khurasani, Sheikh Muhammad-Taha Najaf, Sayyid Muhammad al-Hindi, and Muhammad-Hassan al-Mamaqani. He then travelled to Samarra in 1908, to study under Mirza Muhammad-Taqi al-Shirazi. He remained in Samarra for ten years studying in its seminary.

During the siege of Kut, Mirza Taqi travelled to Kadhimiya, who feared that Samarra could end up like Kut, and that way many from the religious sphere would die. al-Balaghi followed Mirza Taqi, and remained in Kadhimiya for two years. He then returned to Najaf in 1920 after his mentor was poisoned.

Students 
Some of al-Balaghi's most notable students included:

 Sayyid Muhammad-Hadi al-Milani
 Sayyid Abu al-Qasim al-Khoei
 Sheikh Muhammad-Amin Zayn al-Din
 Sheikh Muhammad-Ridha Tabsi

Works 
al-Balaghi enjoyed a library of publications, and wrote about many things include jurisprudence, principles of jurisprudence, Quranic exegesis, inter-faith matters. Some of his books included:

 al-Huda Ala Din al-Mustafa (Guidance on the religion of al-Mustafa). 2 volumes. A response to the Christian Ethiopian hermit Abd al-Thaluth al-Habashi.
 al-Rihla al-Madrasiyah (The School Journey). 3 volumes. A critique of other faiths.
 Anwar al-Huda (The Light of Guidance). A deconstruction of atheism.
 Nasa'ih al-Huda (Advice of Guidance). A deconstruction of Bábism.
 Risalat al-Tawhid wal-Tathleeth (Letter of Oneness and Threeness)
 A'jeeb al-Akatheeb (Wonders of Lies)
 Ajiwabat al-Masa'il al-Baghdadiya (Answers to Baghdadi Questions). A book of principles of jurisprudence.
 al-Balagh al-Mubeen (The True Eloquence). A book of mysticism.
 Alaa' al Rahman Fi Tafsir al-Quran (The Mercifuls Wonders in the Exegesis of the Quran). A book of Quranic exegesis.

Personal life 
al-Balaghi married the daughter of Sayyid Musa al-Jazayeri al-Kadhimi in 1889, whilst he was in Kadhimiya. He only had daughters, and no sons.

Death 
He died in the early hours of Friday December 3, 1933. He is buried in the third southern room of the west wing of the courtyard of the Imam Ali Shrine.

See also 
 Mirza Jawad Maleki Tabrizi
 Hibatuddin Shahrestani
 Mohammad Hossein Esheni Qudejani
 Noureddin Qudejani Esheni

References

Further reading 

BALĀḠĪ, MOḤAMMAD-JAWĀD by Encyclopædia Iranica.

External links 

 al-Balaghi's Library by al-Feker E-book Network

1865 births
1933 deaths
Critics of Christianity
Iraqi Shia Muslims
Iraqi male writers
Religious writers
Burials at Imam Ali Mosque
Pupils of Muhammad Kadhim Khorasani